Prostanthera incurvata is a species of flowering plant in the family Lamiaceae and is endemic to the inland of Western Australia. It is a small, erect shrub with hairy branches, narrow oblong to narrow egg-shaped leaves with the narrower end towards the base, and pink to red, sometimes yellow flowers.

Description
Flowering occurs from in April or from August to October.

Taxonomy
Prostanthera incurvata was first formally described in 1987 by Barry Conn in the Journal of the Adelaide Botanic Gardens from specimens collected near Lake Cowan.

Distribution and habitat
This mintbush sometimes grows in low woodland, and has been collected in the Avon Wheatbelt, Coolgardie and Mallee biogeographic regions.

Conservation status
Prostanthera incurvata is classified as "not threatened" by the Government of Western Australia Department of Parks and Wildlife.

References

incurvata
Flora of Western Australia
Lamiales of Australia
Taxa named by Barry John Conn
Plants described in 1984